Glaucocharis longqiensis is a moth in the family Crambidae. It was described by Shi-Mei Song in 1993. It is found in Fujian, China.

References

Diptychophorini
Moths described in 1993